The Night of the Iguana is a 1964 American drama film directed by John Huston, based on the 1961 play of the same name by Tennessee Williams. It stars Richard Burton, Ava Gardner, Deborah Kerr and Sue Lyon.

The film won the 1964 Academy Award for Best Costume Design, and was nominated for the Academy Awards for Best Art Direction and Best Cinematography. Actress Grayson Hall received Academy Award and Golden Globe nominations for Best Supporting Actress, and Cyril Delevanti received a Golden Globe nomination for Best Supporting Actor. In addition to Delevanti's nomination at the Golden Globes, Ava Gardner also received a Best Actress in a Motion Picture – Drama nomination. Both the picture and its director, John Huston, likewise received Golden Globe nominations.

The Night of the Iguana drew considerable attention for its on-set drama because Burton would bring his soon-to-be-wife Elizabeth Taylor to the location set.

Plot
The preface to the story shows Episcopal clergyman T. Lawrence Shannon having a "nervous breakdown" after being ostracized by his congregation and defrocked for having an inappropriate relationship with a "very young Sunday school teacher."

Two years later, Shannon, now a tour guide for the bottom-of-the-barrel Texas company Blake's Tours, is taking a group of Baptist schoolteachers by bus to Puerto Vallarta, Mexico. The group's brittle leader is Miss Judith Fellowes, whose 16-year-old niece Charlotte Goodall tries to seduce Shannon. Meanwhile, Fellowes accuses Shannon of trying to seduce Charlotte and declares that she will ruin him.

While approaching the group's hotel in the bus, Shannon suddenly veers off and recklessly drives the terrified passengers to a cheap Costa Verde hotel in Mismaloya, then removes the distributor cap from the engine. Shannon assumes that the hotel is run by an old friend named Fred, but the man had died recently and the hotel is now run by Fred's widow, the bawdy and flamboyant Maxine Faulk. Shannon convinces Maxine to allow the tour group to stay at the hotel, believing that they will be unable to reach a phone or escape.

Another new arrival at the hotel is Hannah Jelkes, a beautiful and chaste itinerant painter from Nantucket who is traveling with her elderly poet grandfather Nonno. They have run out of money, but Shannon convinces Maxine to let them have a room. Over a long night, Shannon battles his weaknesses for both flesh and alcohol, Miss Fellowes' niece continues to make trouble for him, and he is "at the end of his rope," similar to how an iguana is kept tied by Maxine's cabana boys. Shannon suffers a breakdown, the cabana boys truss him in a hammock, and Hannah ministers to him there with poppy-seed tea and frank spiritual counsel. Shannon frees the iguana from its rope.

Hannah's grandfather delivers the final version of the poem that he has been laboring to finish, about having heart in a corrupt world, and then dies. The characters try to resolve their confused lives, with Shannon and Maxine deciding to run the hotel together, although Maxine had offered to walk away and let Hannah run the hotel with Shannon. Hannah walks away from her last chance at love.

Cast
 Richard Burton as the Reverend Dr. T. Lawrence Shannon
 Ava Gardner as Maxine Faulk
 Deborah Kerr as Hannah Jelkes
 Sue Lyon as Charlotte Goodall
 James ("Skip") Ward as Hank Prosner
 Grayson Hall as Judith Fellowes, Charlotte's chaperone
 Cyril Delevanti as Nonno, poet and Hannah's grandfather

Production
James Garner claimed that he was originally offered the role played by Richard Burton but he declined because "it was just too Tennessee Williams for me."

In September 1963, Huston, Lyon and Burton, accompanied by Elizabeth Taylor, arrived at Puerto Vallarta—a "remote little fishing village"—for principal photography, which lasted 72 days. Huston liked the area's fishing so much that he bought a $30,000 house "in a cottage colony eight miles outside town."

By March 1964, months before the film's release, gossip about the film's production was widespread. Huston received a Writers Guild of America award for advancing "the literature of the motion picture through the years." At the award dinner, Allan Sherman performed a song to the tune of "Streets of Laredo" with lyrics that included, "They were down there to film The Night of the Iguana / With a star-studded cast and a technical crew. / They did things at night midst the flora and fauna / That no self-respecting iguana would do."

Reception
The film grossed $12 million worldwide at the box office, earning $4.5 million in U.S. theatrical rentals It was the 10th highest-grossing film of 1964.

Time magazine's reviewer wrote, "Huston and company put together a picture that excites the senses, persuades the mind, and even occasionally speaks to the spirit—one of the best movies ever made from a Tennessee Williams play."

Bosley Crowther of The New York Times wrote:

Since difficulty of communication between individuals seems to be one of the sadder of human misfortunes that Tennessee Williams is writing about in his play, The Night of the Iguana, it is ironical that the film John Huston has made from it has difficulty in communicating, too. At least, it has difficulty in communicating precisely what it is that is so barren and poignant about the people it brings to a tourist hotel run by a sensual American woman on the west coast of Mexico. And because it does have difficulty—because it doesn't really make you see what is so helpless and hopeless about them—it fails to generate the sympathy and the personal compassion that might make their suffering meaningful.

Crowther was particularly critical of Burton's performance: "Mr. Burton is spectacularly gross, a figure of wild disarrangement, but without a shred of real sincerity. You see a pot-bellied scarecrow flapping erratically. And in his ridiculous early fumbling with the Lolitaish Sue Lyon (whose acting is painfully awkward), he is farcical when he isn't grotesque."

Awards and nominations

Legacy
A statue of John Huston stands in Puerto Vallarta, celebrating the film's role in making the area a popular destination.

References

External links

 
 
 
 

1964 films
1964 drama films
American black-and-white films
American drama films
American films based on plays
1960s English-language films
Films based on works by Tennessee Williams
Films directed by John Huston
Films scored by Benjamin Frankel
Films set in hotels
Films set in Mexico
Films that won the Best Costume Design Academy Award
Films with screenplays by John Huston
Metro-Goldwyn-Mayer films
1960s American films